Central Guánica was a sugar mill located in Ensenada Barrio in the municipality of Guánica, Puerto Rico. It was one of the largest sugar mills in the Caribbean, and until World War I, it was one of the largest mills in the world. 
It ceased operations in 1982.

History
Its owners, the South Puerto Rico Sugar Company of New Jersey, began construction of the Central Guánica sugar mill in 1901. The Central Guánica was one of the first corporations to organize a company town in Puerto Rico around the sugar mill. The town included a hospital, school and housing facilities.

In 2002, the government of Puerto Rico declared the two chimneys of the sugar mill as historic monuments.

Gallery

See also

 Central Coloso
Central Cortada
 Central San Vicente

References

External links

Sugar refineries
Guánica, Puerto Rico
Sugar industry in Puerto Rico
Sugar companies of the United States
1901 establishments in Puerto Rico
1982 disestablishments in the United States
Industrial buildings completed in 1901
Industrial buildings and structures in Puerto Rico